Boris Kõrver (12 April 1917, Revel – 17 August 1994, Tallinn) was a Soviet and Estonian composer.

In 1950, he graduated from Tallinn State Conservatory in composition specialty.

During World War II, he belonged to State Artistic Ensembles of the Estonian SSR in Yaroslavl.

Since 1944, he was a member of Estonian Composers' Union. From 1953 to 1966, he was deputy chairman and from 1966 to 1974 chairman of Estonian Composers' Union. His daughter is director and cinematographer Marianne Kõrver.

Awards
 Two Estonian SSR State Prizes (1949, 1950)
 Stalin Prize, 3rd class (1951)
 Merited Art Worker of the Estonian SSR (1955)
 Two Orders of the Red Banner of Labour (1956, 1971)
 People's Artist of the Estonian SSR (1965)
 Order of the Badge of Honour (1967)
 Order of Friendship of Peoples

Works

 operette "Ainult unistus" (1955)
 operette "Laanelill" (1959)
 operette "Teie soov palun?" (1962)
 musical "Mees pisuhännaga" (1968)
 musical "Kapsad ja kuningad" (1971)

References

1917 births
1994 deaths
20th-century Estonian composers
Musicians from Tallinn
People from the Governorate of Estonia
Estonian Academy of Music and Theatre alumni
People's Artists of the Estonian Soviet Socialist Republic
Stalin Prize winners
Recipients of the Order of Friendship of Peoples
Recipients of the Order of the Red Banner of Labour
Male operetta composers
Estonian classical composers
Estonian composers

Soviet male classical composers
Soviet male composers